The 2009–10 season is PAS Giannina F.C.'s 16th competitive season in the top flight of Greek football, 1st season in the Superleague Greece, and 44th year in existence as a football club. They also compete in the Greek Cup.

Players

International players

Foreign players

Personnel

Management

Coaching staff

Medical staff

Academy

Transfers

Summer

In

Out

Winter

In

Out

Pre-season and friendlies

Competitions

Super League Greece

League table

Results summary

Fixtures

Greek cup

Round of 32

Round of 16

Quarter-finals

Semi-finals

Statistics

Appearances 

Super League Greece

Goalscorers 

Super League Greece

Clean sheets

Disciplinary record

References

External links 

 Official Website

PAS Giannina F.C. seasons
Greek football clubs 2009–10 season